Andrei Medvedev was the defending champion, but lost in the semifinals to Michael Stich.

Magnus Gustafsson won the title by defeating Stich 6–3, 6–4, 3–6, 4–6, 6–4 in the final.

Seeds
All seeds received a bye to the second round.

Draw

Finals

Top half

Section 1

Section 2

Bottom half

Section 3

Section 4

References

External links
 Official results archive (ATP)
 Official results archive (ITF)

Stuttgart Singles
Singles 1993